"V2" is a 1985 non-album single by That Petrol Emotion.

Track listing 7"

Track listing 12"

Personnel 
Steve Mack - Vocals
John O'Neill - Guitar
Raymond Gorman - Guitar
Damian O'Neill - Bass Guitar
Ciaran McLaughlin - Drums

References

1985 songs
That Petrol Emotion songs
Songs written by John O'Neill (guitarist)